Kosovo is a village in Treklyano municipality, Kyustendil Province, Bulgaria, located at . The village is in a mountainous area, five kilometers away from the border of Serbia.

Kosovo was first mentioned in 1576 as Kosova. The name is derived from the Serbian word for blackbird, kos (кос). There is a legend that the village was founded by Serb refugees from the region of Kosovo, which is also likely.

References

Villages in Kyustendil Province